Ambikapur, station code ABKP, is a railway station that connects the city of Ambikapur and is the connecting point of Surguja district and Surajpur district falls within the Eastern Railway zone of the Indian Railways.

History
This is one of the Railway stations that connects North Chhatishgarh with Raipur. The Railway Ministry plans to build a new  km line between Ambikapur (Chhattisgarh) and Barwadih (Jharkhand).

Britishers were the first to moot the proposal way back in 1925 to connect Ambikapur and Barwadih, both coal-rich areas, by rail. The plan was aimed to facilitate the transportation of minerals.

The Britishers knew the importance of the rail line and the work on the project was started in the early 1930s after conducting the survey, sources added. The required land for the project was also acquired. But the work was stopped during World War II and the project had been pending since then, sources said.

The new rail line will give connectivity from Howrah, Dhanbad & Ranchi to Mumbai via  Lohardaga, Barkakana, Latehar, Barwadih, Ambikapur, Katni, Jabalpur & Itarsi. It would help reducing the rail distance between the two Metros. At present, both the Metros are connected by two different rail routes one via Nagpur & Bilaspur and another via Itarsi & Jabalpur.

The railway runs maximum trains between both the Metros via Nagpur–Bilaspur section. Besides a daily Kolkata mail, a couple of weekly trains chug on Jabalpur–Itarsi section.

Sources said that the new  Barwadih–Ambikapur line would change the rail map route between Howrah and Mumbai.

Trains Operating

ABKP-NZM AC Special

ABKP-JBP Intercity Express

ABKP-DURG Express

ABKP-APR Memu

See also 
 Barwadih
 Latehar
 Palamu

References

External links 
 

Railway stations in Latehar district
Bilaspur railway division